Sif Saga (born 20 September 1997) is a model, actress and song writer from Iceland.

Early life 
Sif Saga Dagbjartsdóttir was born and raised in Boston to Icelandic parents. She started singing at a tender age getting involved with choirs and any events that has to do with music. Her love for fashion began at the age of 12, when she studied at Brewster Academy in Wolfeboro, New Hampshire, she then decided to finish her high school in New York City to graduate early and start her career.

Career 
After living in Miami and Paris for her modelling career, Saga moved to Los Angeles in 2016, where she got her first Elle cover in Argentina. She got influenced in doing music from the songwriters and musicians whom she knew. In 2018, Saga then moved to New York where she prepared for a film called Feral State. She later signed with Supreme Management in September 2019. Feral State was released in May 2021.

Covers 
 Elle Argentina 2016, 2017 and 2020
 Prestige Runway 2016
 Trend Prive 2018
 Harpers Bazaar Turkey 2018
 708 Magazine 2019
 Elle Bulgaria 2018
 Numero Russia 2019

References

External links 

1997 births
Living people
Icelandic female models
People from Boston